Bergs is a surname. Notable people with the surname include:

Arveds Bergs (1875–1941), Latvian lawyer, newspaper editor, and politician
Frantz Bergs (c. 1697–1787), Swedish goldsmith, father of Julius Marianus Bergs
Julius Marianus Bergs (1741–1804), Swedish silversmith, son of Frantz Bergs
Kristaps Bergs, Latvian cello soloist
Zizou Bergs (born 1999), Belgian tennis player

See also
Berg (surname)